Morris Cowley was a name given to various cars produced by Morris from 1915 to 1958.

Morris Cowley Bullnose (1915)

The Continental Cowley, shown to the press in April 1915, was a larger engined (1495 cc against 1018 cc), longer, wider and better equipped version of the first Morris Oxford with the same "Bullnose" radiator; in addition it could carry a four-passenger body. To reduce the price many components were bought from United States suppliers. The 1495 cc, side valve, four cylinder engine was made by Continental Motor Manufacturing Company of Detroit, and the clutch and three speed gearbox by Detroit Gear & Machine Co. Back axle, front axle and steering gear also came from the USA. Supply of these components was badly affected by World War I. The suspension used semi elliptic leaf springs at the front and three quarter elliptics at the rear.

The central position of the handbrake and ball change gear lever revealed the gearbox's US origin. It also made for easy entry through the driver's door and no cold steel up a driver's leg. The petrol tank was in the scuttle and its filler was above the gear lever in the centre of the dashboard.

The US-made back axle was the first helically cut drive in a quantity produced British car.

Electric lighting was standard. It was the first Morris car to be sold like that. The 6-volt Lucas lamps were a set of five, powered by a belt-driven dynamo fixed to the engine by its cylinder head studs. The cost of these few electrical components was equivalent to 59% of the cost of the imported engine. The delivery van body was not provided with electric lighting.

More expensive than Oxford
There was no austerity for the Cowley though it was at first slightly cheaper than the Oxford. There was diamond patterned buttoned upholstery in real leather set off by mahogany cappings, and a proper door for the driver. The mudguards were black and the standard body colour was a chocolate brown. The Cowley did not become a stripped down Oxford until 1919.

McKenna duties
Although first shown to the press in April 1915 the new car was not generally available until late summer that year just when the government suddenly imposed the McKenna duties. A tax of 33% was imposed on imported "luxury" goods but demand for the Cowleys seemed to ignore the price rises.

source

The last Continental Cowley was assembled in 1920 finishing the stock of original engines. Three thousand engines were despatched to Morris but more than half were lost by enemy action while crossing the Atlantic leaving around 1,500 sets of certain chassis components unsold. More recent research suggests that there may have been only one shipment of about 150 lost through enemy action and orders for more shipments were cancelled.

Designed for mass production
Excellent American automobile engineering and production techniques made the first Cowley a great success. The cars were the right design for quantity production when Morris entered quantity production in the 1920s and their high quality engineering created a reputation for utter reliability and resistance to the most shocking abuse.

Bullnose and Flatnose engines U.S. and Coventry made
<div style="float:left;width:33%;">

</div style="float:left;width:33%;">
<div style="float:left;width:33%;">

</div style="float:left;width:33%;">
<div style="float:left;width:33%;">

</div style="float:left;width:33%;">

Morris Cowley Bullnose (1919)

The updated Cowley for 1919 had an engine made by the British branch of the French Hotchkiss company, which was essentially a copy of the early Continental unit which was no longer being made. It was the basic model of the Morris two car range of the time with the Oxford, which used the same 1.5L 26 bhp engine until 1923, having leather upholstery and upgraded lighting as the de-luxe version.

Morris acquired the British interests of Hotchkiss in 1923 and renamed them Morris engines branch.

Morris Cowley Flatnose (1926–1931)

The Bullnose radiator was replaced by a more conventional flat radiator announced 11 September 1926 on new cars now with doors either side and a longer list of accessories supplied as standard. All steel bodies were coming available. The engines remained the same, but the Cowley unlike the Oxford, retained braking on the rear wheels only as standard, although a front brake system was available at extra cost (featured car has this fitted). The chassis was new and the suspension was updated with semi elliptic leaf springs all round plus Smiths friction type scissor shock absorbers. The brakes are rod and spring operated with cams inside the drums to actuate. Interesting to note that the rear brake drums include two sets of shoes, one of which is connected directly to the handbrake.

The chassis was further modified in 1931 to bring it in line with the Morris Major. Wire wheels became an option instead of the solid spoked artillery ones previously fitted.

Morris Cowley (1931)

A considerably changed Cowley was announced on 29 August 1931. In common with the rest of the Morris range the coachwork of the now six models of Cowley was redesigned for a more pleasing appearance with a fashionable "eddy-free" leading edge to the roof of closed cars,  petrol tanks located at the rear of the chassis, chrome finish to all bright parts, Magna type wire wheels as standard. There was a new chassis frame giving a lower body. Springs had been made longer and more resilient. Bigger brake drums were provided and the brakes were now actuated hydraulically and supplied by Lockheed. There was a new radiator to match with the large hub wire wheels. The engine's connecting rods were now Duralumin. A sports coupé body was added to the range. Either the 11.9 or 14/32 engine was supplied to order for the same price. There were no more four seater tourers.

Revised
A revised ("transformed" said the advertising) lower body with a new 11.9 hp engine behind a new, sloping, radiator and still of the same 1548 cc was announced 28 August 1933 along with a four-speed Twin-Top syncromesh gearbox, shorter stronger cruciform chassis, leather upholstery, draught excluders over the gear lever and pedal slots and a battery master switch (in case of fire). Closed cars were given a sun visor. Additional equipment included bumpers front and rear and luggage grid and parcel net

Morris Twelve
From late 1934 this car was badged Morris Twelve Four.

Morris Cowley Six

Announced 28 August 1933 the 1934 Cowley Six replaced the Morris Major keeping the same 1938 cc six cylinder, side valve engine but with a new lower chassis. Along with all other Morris cars the Cowley now has a syncromesh four-speed gearbox, dipping headlights, hydraulic shock absorbers, leather upholstery, hydraulic brakes, rear petrol tank, direction indicators, safety glass, battery master switches and automatic ignition. There was a matching smaller 12 hp 1378 cc Morris Ten Six.
Prices:
 Saloon £215 or £220 fixed or sliding head
 Special coupé £265

The Cowley Six became the Fifteen-Six in 1935.

Morris Cowley MCV (1950–1956)

Introduced in 1950, the Cowley MCV commercial vehicle range was based on the Morris Oxford MO. It was offered in van, pick-up and chassis-cab versions.

1954 Morris Cowley

The 1954 Morris Cowley was a four-cylinder midsize car produced from 1954 to 1959. It was essentially a budget version of the Morris Oxford series III with less chrome, no heater, fixed front quarter lights and a simplified dashboard.

Morris Cowley 1200

This new Morris Cowley was launched on 14 July 1954 as a smaller engined more simply furnished supplement to the Morris Oxford series II launched two months earlier. The engine, the 1.2 L (1200 cc) B-Series unit was a new design also used in the Austin A40 and Nash Metropolitan. Its power output was 42 bhp at 4,500 rpm.

The monocoque body shell was that of the four door Morris Oxford series II, the Cowley also sharing its torsion beam front suspension and live rear axle but with smaller  brake drums on early models. Some of the Oxford's exterior chrome has been removed to simplify the appearance and some has been replaced with stainless steel. Plastic-covered felt has been used in place of interior carpet. Quarter lights are fixed on the Cowley though the main windows wind down in the usual way. Steering was of the conventional rack and pinion type.

The test car cost £702 including taxes.

Morris Cowley 1500

On 12 October 1956 it was announced that the 1200 engine had been replaced by the Oxford's larger 1.5 L (1489 cc) engine and the exterior styling amended in line with the Morris Oxford Series III.

½-ton series III

The Morris ½-ton series III was a commercial vehicle variant of the Morris Oxford series III. It was introduced in 1956, replacing the Morris Cowley MCV and was offered in van, pick-up and chassis-cab body styles. The series III was replaced by a Morris version of the Austin A55 van in 1962.
The commercials never had the series III bonnet and headlamp cowls. Again the Cowley name never appeared on the vehicles and it is very likely that no more left the factory after 1960. A gown van based on this vehicle appears in the Peter Sellars film Wrong Arm of the Law.

See also
 Morris and Cowley, a comedy double act who took their name from the car

References 

Cowley
Cars introduced in 1915
1920s cars
1930s cars
1950s cars